Cloquet Public Schools (ISD94) is a school district headquartered in Cloquet, Minnesota.

Ken Scarbrough served as superintendent until his retirement. Michael Cary became the superintendent in 2018. In 2020 the school district renewed his contract effective July 1 of that year, running until June 30, 2024.

It is partially in Carlton County, where it serves almost all of Cloquet, all of Scanlon, and a portion of Big Lake. It also serves sections of St. Louis County.

Schools
 Cloquet High School
 Cloquet Middle School
 Churchill Elementary School
 Washington Elementary School

See also
 Fond du Lac Ojibwe School - Tribal school in Cloquet

References

External links
 Cloquet Public Schools
School districts in Minnesota
Education in Carlton County, Minnesota
Education in St. Louis County, Minnesota